The Department of the Arts, Sport, the Environment, Tourism and Territories was an Australian government department that existed between July 1987 and December 1991.

Scope
Information about the department's functions and/or government funding allocation could be found in the Administrative Arrangements Orders, the annual Portfolio Budget Statements and in the Department's annual reports.

At its creation, the Department dealt with:
Cultural affairs, including support for the arts 
National collections 
National heritage 
Sport and recreation 
Environment and conservation 
Tourism, including the tourist industry International expositions and support for international conferences and special events
Administration of the Australian Capital Territory 
Administration of the Jervis Bay Territory, the Territory of Cocos (Keeling) Islands, the Territory of Christmas Island, the Coral Sea  Islands Territory, the Territory of Ashmore and Cartier Islands, the Australian Antarctic Territory, and the Territory of Heard  Island and the McDonald Islands, and of Commonwealth responsibilities on Norfolk Island 
Constitutional development of the Northern Territory of Australia.

Structure
The Department was an Australian Public Service department, staffed by officials responsible to the Minister for the Arts, Sport, the Environment and Tourism and Territories.

References

Ministries established in 1987
Arts, Sport, the Environment, Tourism and Territories
Defunct environmental agencies